Erik Jacquemyn (born 1958) is a Belgian scientist.  In 1985 he became the Flemish Government’s Minister-President’s science and technology advisor. He was instrumental in the establishment of the Flemish Science Week, Flanders Science Week, the Science Festival, and the Science Truck among others. In 2000 he established Belgium’s first scientific hands-on centre – the Technopolis. In 2011 he became Chair of the International Program Committee (IPC). He also co-authored the Mechelen Declaration in 2014.

Jacquemyn has received the Paul Harris Fellowship from Rotary International (1989); the Flemish Minister of Scientific Policy prize (2006);  the Knowledge Economy Network Award, the ASTC Roy L. Shafer Leading Edge Award for Experienced Leadership in the Field (both in 2014) and the UNESCO Kalinga Prize for the Popularization of Science in 2017. In 2010 he was honored by being called upon to both organize and chair the first-ever Science Centre World Summit which took place in 2014.

References 

1958 births
Living people
21st-century Belgian scientists
Kalinga Prize recipients
Date of birth missing (living people)
Place of birth missing (living people)